Suspended Animation is the first studio album by Dream Theater guitarist John Petrucci, released independently in 2005 through Sound Mind Music. The songs "Jaws of Life", "Glasgow Kiss" and "Damage Control" have been played during the G3 tour, and the latter two are featured as openers to the 2005 DVD and live album G3: Live in Tokyo. Some releases of the album have "Curve" split into two separate tracks, with the majority of the song on track six and the latter portion on track seven. On these editions, "Lost Without You" and "Animate-Inanimate" form tracks eight and nine respectively. The correct track listing, without the aforementioned anomalies, is shown below.

Critical reception

Mark Sabbatini at All About Jazz gave Suspended Animation a mixed review, initially criticizing some songs as sounding like "what feels like a market-driven formula for success." He nonetheless noted "Animate-Inanimate" as a highlight, while praising Petrucci's guitar tone, which he described as "clear and distinct even during moments of high-speed indulgence" and setting him apart from his contemporaries.

Track listing

Personnel
John Petrucci – guitar, production
Dave DiCenso – drums (except track 3)
Tony Verderosa – drums (track 3), remixing
Dave LaRue – bass (except track 3)
Tim Lefebvre – bass (track 3)
Doug Oberkircher – engineering
Steve Hardy – engineering
Kevin Shirley – mixing
Howie Weinberg – mastering

References

External links
John Petrucci - Suspended Animation (CD) at Metal-Temple

John Petrucci albums
2005 debut albums